Vitamin Records is a Los Angeles-based record label founded in 1999 as a subsidiary of CMH Records. The label was formerly home to the Vitamin String Quartet, who are best known for performing string quartet tributes to popular rock and metal acts such as Tool, Nine Inch Nails, and Radiohead. Vitamin Records has also produced tribute albums in several other styles including lounge, electronica, industrial, and dub music.

The label's first release was The String Quartet Tribute to Led Zeppelin in 1999. Since then, Vitamin Records has released over 185 albums in a variety of genres.

Vitamin Records has also released an album honoring songs from the popular video game series Guitar Hero.

Media
 The Vitamin String Quartet contributed a recording of "Jack and Sally Montage" to Nightmare Revisited, which was released on September 30, 2008 by Walt Disney Records and also included tracks by Marilyn Manson, Korn and Shiny Toy Guns.
 Three songs from Vitamin Records have been featured on the Fox television show So You Think You Can Dance, including "Control", from Vitamin String Quartet's tribute to Janet Jackson in July 2008, "Hallelujah" from Vitamin String Quartet's tribute to Paramore (July 2008), and "Yellow" from Vitamin String Quartet's tribute to Coldplay (December 2009).

Releases
 Partial discography

References 

Tribute albums
American record labels
Record labels established in 1999
1999 establishments in California